The Google Founders' Award was a special award for entrepreneurial achievement awarded to groups at Google Inc. 

The awards are given in the form of stock grants, and the program was initiated in 2004 by Google founders Sergey Brin and Lawrence E. Page to reward groups.

External links
 "New Incentive for Google Employees: Awards Worth Millions" (The New York Times, 2005)

Founders' Award
Google Founders' Award
Google Founders' Award